Nein (Nayin, lit. Charming) — also Nain or Naim in English — is an Arab village in northern Israel. Its total land area consisted of 3,737 dunums prior to 1962.

Location
Nein lies a short distance from Mount Tabor. A hill known in Arabic as Tell el-Ajul lay on the path that ran between Nein and nearby Indur, an Arab village destroyed in the 1948 Arab-Israeli war. Biblical archaeologist Edward Robinson describes Nein as lying on the northern slope of a hill called "the little Hermon", and it is described in biblical guidebooks as lying at the foot of the Hill of Moreh.

History

Antiquity
Rock-sunk tombs have been found here, probably of Christian origin.

Nein is mentioned in the writing of Eusebius (c. 263–339) and Jerome (c. 347–420) as being situated near Endor (Indur). Its identity as a biblical site was recognized by the Crusaders, who built a church there to commemorate the site of the miracle, a church rebuilt by the Franciscans.

In 1101,  during the Crusader era, Tancred, Prince of Galilee granted   Nein together with several other villages to the abbey of Mount Tabor.  In 1153, it belonged to the Hospitallers.  By 1263, the area was ruled by Baybars.

Ottoman era
It had a population of 119 households, all Muslim. They paid a fixed  tax-rate of 25% on agricultural products, including wheat, barley, summer crops, olive trees, goats and beehives, in addition to winter pastures and occasional revenues;  the taxes totalled 80,000  akçe.

In 1838 Robinson and Smith  noted that Nein had decreased in size over the ages, and was at  time a small hamlet, inhabited by  a few families.  In 1875 Victor Guérin  saw here a ruined building, measuring 18 times 12 paces.

In  the Palestine Exploration Fund's Survey of Western Palestine (1882),  Nein was described as a small village made of stone and adobe, with a small mosque, named Mukam Sidna Aisa, to the north.

British Mandate era
In the  1922 census of Palestine conducted by the British authorities, Nain had a population of 157, all Muslims, increasing in the 1931 census to 189, still all Muslim, in a total of 34  houses.

Of this,  were for plantations and irrigable land, 3,602  for cereals, while 31 dunams were classified as built-up areas.

New Testament associations

Edward Robinson and Eli Smith, who visited Palestine in the mid-19th century, identified Nein as, "the Nain of the New Testament" where, according to Luke , Jesus raised a young man from death and reunited him with his mother. According to Luke's account, this young man was the only son of an unnamed widow. When Jesus saw the dead son being carried out and the mourning widow, he felt compassion for her. He walked towards the bier or stretcher, touched it, stopped the funeral procession and told the man: "Young man, I say to you, arise!" The man came alive, sat up, and began to speak. The people who were standing around were all  struck by the event, seen as a sign that 'a great prophet' had arisen among them, and the report of it spread widely across Judea and the surrounding region. Nain is not mentioned in the other canonical gospels.

References

Bibliography

 
  
 

  

  
  p. 734

External links
Welcome To Na'in
Survey of Western Palestine, Map 9:  IAA, Wikimedia commons

Arab villages in Israel
New Testament places
Populated places in Northern District (Israel)